Llangenny is a village in the Brecon Beacons National Park, Powys, Wales. It is in the lower reaches of the Grwyne Fawr. The Vale of Grwyney community consists of Glangrwyney, Llanbedr, and Llangenny.

Three features in Llangenny are the grade II* listed St.Cenau or Saint Keyne parish church, the Dragons Head Inn and Cwm Barn, an old barn converted into accommodation. The population is approximately 100.

The area is popular with hill-walkers and for camping and outdoor activities.

Notable People 
John Martyn Roberts FRSE (1806-1878) inventor with his unique galvanic battery, buried in Llangenny Churchyard
Richard William Davies (19th C.) a Welsh Anglican priest and archdeacon of Brecon from 1859 to 1875.

External links
Brecknock Churches survey for Llangenny

Villages in Powys
Black Mountains, Wales